Cultural interest fraternities and sororities, in the North American student fraternity and sorority system, refer to general, social organizations oriented to students having a special interest in a culture or cultural identity.

Although racial and religious restrictions have long since been abolished in all North American Interfraternity Conference and National Panhellenic Conference organizations, their memberships nationally remain predominantly Caucasian, and National Pan-Hellenic Council memberships largely African American. The new generation of cultural interest organizations has arisen to serve the interests of communities whose numbers in the traditional Greek system are historically small and dispersed.

Following is a list of national cultural interest fraternities and sororities.

African American

Armenian

Asian American 

Asian American interest in Greek-lettered organizations began in the early 20th century. After World War II, there was a surge in participation to join these organizations, as college campuses were seeing a rise in multiculturalism. Rho Psi was the first Asian American interest Greek-lettered organization and was created on the campus of Cornell University in 1916. Since then, there has been growth in these Asian American interest Greek lettered organizations across North America. There are over sixty Asian American interest Greek-lettered organizations, many of which are overseen by the National APIDA Panhellenic Association.

Active organizations are in bold, and inactive organizations are in italics.

Christian

Italian-American

Jewish

Latino

LGBT

Multicultural 
These organizations do not identify with a specific cultural identity. Some may fall under associations that cater to specific cultural backgrounds, however, the organization itself refers to itself as Multicultural.

Muslim

Native American

Persian

South Asian

Notes

See also 

 Fraternities and sororities in Canada
 Fraternities and sororities in North America
 List of fraternities and sororities in France
 List of fraternities and sororities in the Philippines
 List of fraternities and sororities in Puerto Rico
 List of social fraternities and sororities
 Professional fraternities and sororities
Racism in United States college fraternities and sororities
 Service fraternities and sororities

References 

Fraternities and sororities by type
Cultural Fraternities and sororities